The European Aleph Institute is a group, founded in 2005 and based in Brussels, dedicated to ensuring the rights of an estimated 3,500 to 5,000 Jews imprisoned in Europe to practice their religion. They arrange for prisoners to be provided with kosher meals, religious texts and ceremonial objects, as well as counseling, education, and financial support to families of prisoners. The expressed intent is to avoid recidivism.

See also
 Aleph Institute - its sister organization in the United States
 North Eastern US Aleph Institute - it's sister organization in North Eastern US

References 

Jews and Judaism in Europe
Jewish community organizations
Religious prison-related organizations